The 1990 Belgian Masters was an invitational snooker tournament played at the Sporthal Schijnpoort in Antwerp in September 1990. John Parrott won the title by beating Jimmy White 9–6 in the final. The final was televised live in Belgium. Parrott made the highest break of the competition, 120, in the thirteenth frame of the final, and won four of the last five frames to claim victory at 9–6.

Prize Fund
The event was sponsored by HUMO and prize money was awarded as follows:
Winner: £30,000
Runner-up £15,000
Semi-finals: £10,000
Quarter-finals £1,500
Highest break: £4,000

Main draw

References

Belgian Masters
1990 in snooker
1990 in Belgian sport